The 2007–08 Serie C1 season was the thirtieth football league season of Italian Serie C1 since its establishment in  1978. It was divided into two phases: the regular season, played from September 2007 to May 2008, and the playoff phase from May to June 2008.

The league was composed of 36 teams divided into two divisions of 18 teams each, whose teams were divided mainly according to geographical principles.

Teams finishing first in the regular season, plus one team winning the playoff round from each division were promoted to Serie B; teams finishing last in the regular season, plus two relegation playoff losers from each division, were relegated to Serie C2. In all, four teams (Sassuolo, Cittadella, Salernitana, and Ancona) were promoted to Serie B, and six teams (Pro Patria, Lecco, Manfredonia, Lanciano, Sangiovannese, and Martina) were relegated to Serie C2.

Events
The line-up was announced on 19 July 2007. No teams were excluded, and all the originally scheduled teams will therefore take part in the league.

The league featured four teams relegated from Serie B in 2006-07 (Verona, Arezzo, Crotone and Pescara) and six promoted from Serie C2 (Legnano, Foligno, Sorrento, Lecco, Paganese and Potenza).

The divisions' composition was confirmed as usual according to latitude. However a number of South teams were included in a division different from their best fitting one in order to reduce the number of potentially heated local derbies. This caused all Tuscan clubs to be included in the Serie C1/B division, otherwise composed mostly by teams hailing from South of Italy, whereas two teams from Campania and two from Apulia were included in the Serie C1/A, which instead features mostly teams from the North.

Promotions

On 27 April 2008, with one week in the regular season yet to be played, both Sassuolo
and Salernitana were mathematically ensured of their respective division titles, thus winning promotion to Serie B for the 2008-09 season.

Clubs

Serie C1/A

Serie C1/B

Final standings

Serie C1/A

Serie C1/B

Promotion and relegation playoffs

Serie C1/A

Promotion
Promotion playoff semifinals
First legs played 18 May 2008; return legs played 25 May 2008
(due to aggregate tie, higher classified team won)

Promotion playoff finals
First leg played 1 June 2008; return leg played 8 June 2008

Cittadella promoted to Serie B

Relegation
Relegation playoffs
First legs played 18 May 2008; return legs played 25 May 2008

Pro Patria and Lecco relegated to Serie C2

Serie C1/B

Promotion
Promotion playoff semifinals
First legs played 18 May 2008; return legs played 25 May 2008
(due to aggregate tie, higher classified team won)

Promotion playoff finals
First leg played 1 June 2008; return leg played 8 June 2008

Ancona promoted to Serie B

Relegation
Relegation playoffs
First legs played 18 May 2008; return legs played 25 May 2008

Sangiovannese and Lanciano relegated to Serie C2

References

External links
Italy Third Level 2007/08 at RSSSF

Serie C1 seasons
Italy
3